This Is What It Feels Like is the second EP by American singer and songwriter Gracie Abrams. It was released on November 12, 2021, through Interscope Records. The project is a primarily a pop record with influences of bedroom pop and indie pop. Abrams co-wrote all the tracks, and as a producer on "Feels Like", which served as the lead single for the project. The production was mainly handled by Aaron Dessner, Joel Little, and Blake Slatkin.

Background 
Instead of this "full-length" being released as Abrams' debut album, it is being billed as a “project” so that she can become more famous before releasing her “debut album.” It continues with the "emotional territory" that is first heard on her EP minor.<ref>{{Cite web |author=NME |date=November 15, 2021 |title=Gracie Abrams on 'Rockland' & new project 'This Is What It Feels Like  In Conversation |url=https://www.youtube.com/watch?v=90gO3awyLbA |website=YouTube |language=en |access-date=April 6, 2022}}</ref>

 Track listing 

 Personnel 
Credits are adapted from the album's liner notes and Tidal.

 Musicians 

 Gracie Abrams - lead vocals (all tracks), songwriting (all tracks), production (1)
 Blake Slatkin - production (1, 5, 7, 11–12), executive producer (12), additional vocals (1), songwriting (1, 5, 12), bass (1), guitar (1, 12), programming (1)
 Aaron Dessner - production (2, 4, 9–10), songwriting (2, 4, 9–10), acoustic guitar (2, 4, 10), bass guitar (2, 10), drum machine (2, 4, 9), drum programming (2, 4, 9), electric guitar (2, 4), percussion (2, 4, 10), piano (2, 4, 9), synthesizer (2, 4, 9), keyboards (4, 9)
 Joel Little - production (3, 6, 8), songwriting (3, 6, 8), bass (6, 8), guitar (6), keyboards (6, 8), synthesizer (6, 8)
 Omer Fedi - production (5), songwriting (1, 5),  guitar (1)
 Carter Lang - production (1), bass (1), programming (1)
 Mick Schultz - co-production (12)
 Bryce Dessner - orchestration (2, 4, 9–10)
 Benjamin Lanz - synthesizer (2, 4, 9–10)
 Yuki Numata Resnick - violin (2, 4, 9–10)
 Clarice Jensen - cello (2, 4, 9–10)
 James McAlister - drum machine (2), drum programming (2), synthesizer (2)
 Ryan Olson - drum machine (2, 4, 9)
 James Krivchenia - drums (2), percussion (2)
 Rob Moose - viola (7), violin (7)
 Sean Hurley - electric bass (12)

 Release history 

 Tour 
In support of This Is What It Feels Like,'' Abrams scheduled the This Is What It Feels Like Tour. It covers North America and Europe with 35 dates. It started on February 2, 2022, in Salt Lake City and concluded on May 31, 2022, in Stockholm. Her shows in Toronto on October 27, and Montreal on October 28, were canceled. Alix Page opened for Abrams. Along with her headlining tour, Abrams also opened for Olivia Rodrigo on the Sour Tour for select dates, where she sang songs featured on the project.

References 

2021 EPs
Gracie Abrams albums
Interscope Records EPs